The Black Dog is a British electronic music group, founded in 1989 by Ken Downie along with Ed Handley and Andy Turner. The group are considered pioneering figures of techno's ruminative "home-listening" aesthetic in the early 1990s. 

Following several self-released EPs, the group signed to Warp Records in 1993 and released albums such as Bytes (1993) and Spanners (1995). In 1995, Handley and Turner departed to work on their spin-off project Plaid. Downie continued recording under band the name, with Richard and Martin Dust joining. The band's early EPs were collected on the 2007 compilation Book of Dogma.

Biography

Early career
In 1989, The Black Dog was unable to find a label to back its releases and started its own, Black Dog Productions, which released four vinyl records including the acclaimed Virtual. These were followed by a number of EPs on the General Production Recordings label. The Black Dog released their first full-length album Bytes on Warp Records on 15 March 1993. The albums Temple of Transparent Balls (GPR) and Spanners (Warp) followed. The music was often produced under a number of different names, such as Close Up Over, Xeper, Atypic, I.A.O., Balil and the Discordian Popes. The group did numerous remixes, notably for Björk, with whom it collaborated on "'Sweet Intuition" (a B-side on the "Army of Me" CD single) and "Charlene" (a b side on the "Isobel" CD single).

In the early 1990s, Downie was also running a bulletin board system called Black Dog Towers.

In 1995, Handley and Turner left to focus on Plaid but Downie continued working as The Black Dog on his own for a while, releasing the solo album Music for Adverts (and Short Films). With new management, and an increased vigour, Downie then teamed up with Steve 'Hotdog' Ash and Ross Knight ("thek1d"). Though they completed over a dozen critically acclaimed remixes during this period, only one album was ever released: Unsavoury Products featured the talents of Parisian beat poet Black Sifichi on vocals.

Current line-up
In 2001, Downie teamed up with Richard and Martin Dust, owners of the label Dust Science Recordings. Since then, they have started to play live again and have released eight EPs and four full-length albums on Dust Science. Their first album, Silenced, was released in 2005. The second, Radio Scarecrow, was released in 2008 and was very well received and nominated for DJ Mag's Best of British 2008.

The follow-up to Radio Scarecrow, Further Vexations, was released in 2009. It was described as having a dark cynicism of Orwellian practices of government and the passivity of the general public. "We’ve helplessly watched with mounting horror, while the government trashed the country, signed away its sovereignty to Brussels (with a flourish of a specially minted silver pen), sold off precious national industries and assets at next to bargain basement prices, and indulged itself with two utterly pointless wars which it couldn’t afford," the group stated on their home page.

In May 2010, the Black Dog teamed with creative agency "Human" to create Music for Real Airports, described by them as "a contemporary reply to Brian Eno's work from the 70s". While Eno's album is well known for being peaceful and sedate, The Black Dog intend theirs to be tense and bittersweet, saying "This record is not necessarily a comfortable listen. But it captures the spectrum of emotions stirred by airports."

Side projects
The initial lineup kept themselves busy with numerous alter-egos and side-projects, including Echo Mike, Close Up Over, Xeper, Atypic, I.A.O., Plaid, Balil and the Discordian Popes. 1993's Bytes compiles an album's worth of tracks by these side projects under the mantle of Black Dog Productions. Of these side-projects, only Plaid continues to be active.

More recently, the current lineup of The Black Dog (Ken Downie with Martin and Richard Dust) have collaborated with Psychick Warriors ov Gaia on a new ambient project called Dadavistic Orchestra. Taking inspiration from the Dada artists of the early 1900s, Dadavistic Orchestra have issued an album and two EPs, offering limited edition gelatin silver prints in homage to avant-garde photographer Man Ray with early copies sold via mail order.

Discography

Albums
Ken Downie with Ed Handley and Andy Turner:
1993 Bytes (as Black Dog Productions)
1993 Temple of Transparent Balls
1995 Spanners

Ken Downie solo:
1996 Music for Adverts (and Short Films)

Ken Downie with Steve Ash and Ross Knight:
2002 Unsavoury Products (featuring Black Sifichi)Ken Downie with Martin Dust and Richard Dust:
2005 Silenced
2008 Radio Scarecrow
2009 Further Vexations
2010 Music for Real Airports
2011 Liber Dogma
2013 Tranklements
2015 Neither/Neither
2018 Black Daisy Wheel
2018 Post-Truth
2020 Fragments
2021 Music for Photographers

EPs

Compilations and live albums
Ken Downie with Ed Handley and Andy Turner:
1995 Parallel
2007 Book of Dogma
2021 Fragments Live

Ken Downie with Steve Ash and Ross Knight:
2003 Genetically Modified (with Black Sifichi, remixes from Unsavoury Products)Ken Downie with Martin Dust and Richard Dust:
2006 Thee Singles
2008 Thee Singles Volume 2
2010 Final Collected Vexations
2014 Liber Collected – Book Ov Law

References

External links
 
 dustscience.com - The Black Dog's Label
 

English techno music groups
Musical groups from Sheffield
Intelligent dance musicians
Warp (record label) artists
Musical groups established in 1989